The following is a list of villages in Ternopil Oblast in Ukraine.

Berezhany Raion

Borshchiv Raion

Buchach Raion

Chortkiv Raion

Husiatyn Raion

Kozova Raion

Kremenets Raion

Lanivtsi Raion

Monastyryska Raion

Pidhaitsi Raion

Pidvolochysk Raion

Shumsk Raion

Terebovlia Raion

Ternopil Raion

Zalishchyky Raion

Zbarazh Raion

Zboriv Raion

See also
List of Canadian place names of Ukrainian origin

References 
  Тернопільська область  

Ternopil